John Joseph Phelan Jr. (May 7, 1931 – August 4, 2012) was an American financier who served as president and later chairman and chief executive of the New York Stock Exchange, where he introduced computerized trading technology.  Phelan's leadership tenure at the NYSE included the 1987 stock market crash, during which he declined to halt trading.  Phelan's calm and confident manner was widely praised.  After the crash, Phelan helped to implement trading curbs also known as "circuit breakers" to help prevent rapid stock selloffs in the future.

Biography
Phelan was born in Manhattan, New York City, on May 7, 1931, to John Phelan Sr., a financier and member of the NYSE, and Edna Kelly.  He started college in 1949, but left after two years to serve in the US Marine Corps.  After returning from the Marines, Phelan went to work as a floor trader with his father's firm, Phelan & Co. and attended Adelphi University, where he received a bachelor's degree in business administration.

John Phelan Jr. died on August 4, 2012, in Manhattan, New York City at age 81 from cancer.

Notable achievements
Phelan became the first foreigner to own shares of a Chinese company when he was presented with a stock certificate of the Flying Happiness Acoustic Company by the then General Secretary of the Communist Party of China Deng Xiaoping in 1986. John Phelan was at that time the head of a US delegation of Wall Street financiers. This was remarkable event that signaled Chinese commitment towards developing its own stock exchange as well as further economic reforms along market economy lines.

Personal life
He married Joyce and had three sons: John, David, and Peter. Phelan was on the board of Catholic Charities.

References

External links

1931 births
2012 deaths
Adelphi University alumni
New York Stock Exchange people
United States Marines
Presidents of the New York Stock Exchange